SS Folgore Falciano Calcio is a Sanmarinese football club, based in Falciano, Serravalle. The club was founded in 1972. Folgore currently plays in Girone A of Campionato Sammarinese di Calcio. The team's colours are red, yellow and black.

Honours
Campionato Sammarinese di Calcio: (5)
 1996–97, 1997–98, 1999-00, 2014–15, 2020–21
Coppa Titano: 1
 2014–15
San Marino Federal Trophy: 2
 1997, 2000
Super Coppa Sammarinese: 1
 2015

European record

Notes
 PR: Preliminary round
 QR: Qualifying round
 1Q: First qualifying round
 2Q: First qualifying round

Current squad

References

External links
Official homepage
FSGC page

 
Association football clubs established in 1972
Football clubs in San Marino
Former Italian football clubs
1972 establishments in San Marino
Serravalle (San Marino)